"Relax" is a song by American singer-songwriter Crystal Waters from her second studio album, Storyteller (1994). It was released in 1995 as the fourth and last single from the album, and peaked at number-one on the Billboard Dance Club Songs chart in the US. It was also classified the Billboard Hot Dance Breakouts number-one for the category of Club Play Singles on July 1, 1995. In the UK, it reached number 37. A black-and-white music video was also produced to promote the single, directed by German director Marcus Nispel.

Critical reception
Larry Flick from Billboard complimented "Relax" as a "breezy, pop-inflected houser", and a "notable single-ready moment" from the Storyteller album. He also called it "lively" and "disco charged". M.R. Martinez from Cash Box felt tracks like "Relax" make the album "more than a dance record." James Masterton for Dotmusic deemed it as "slightly formulaic and disappointing". Ross Jones from The Guardian said that Waters "delivers another of her berserkly positive electro-scat anthems, this one imploring you to kick back even when you're "mad at the world"." Chuck Campbell from Knoxville News Sentinel described it as a "thick disco song". A reviewer from Music Week gave it three out of five, declaring it as "an uplifting and catchy track with those recognisable vocals that feels as though it might be equally at home on radio as in the clubs." Michael Wilson of Rolling Stone felt songs like "Relax" "are pleasant enough but don't push Waters beyond where she has been before." Jonathan Bernstein from Spin viewed it as a "potential successor" to Waters' signature singles.

Track listing and formats 
 12" single, US
 "Relax" (Jazz-N-Groove Club Mix) – 10:13
 "Relax" (LP Version) – 3:29
 "Relax" (Lorimer Vission Mix) – 6:10
 "Relax" (Tony B!'s Mix) – 7:09

 CD single, Europe
 "Relax" (Lorimer Vission Radio Edit) – 3:09
 "Relax" (LP Version) – 3:29
 "Relax" (Lorimer Vission Mix) – 6:10
 "Relax" (Tin Tin Out Crystalized Mix) – 6:51

 CD maxi, Canada
 "Relax" (LP Version) – 3:29
 "Relax" (Lorimer Vission Radio Mix) – 3:09
 "Relax" (Jazz-N-Groove Club Mix) – 10:13
 "Relax" (Lorimer Vission Mix) – 6:10
 "Relax" (Tony B's Mix) – 7:09

Charts

References

1995 singles
1995 songs
American house music songs
Black-and-white music videos
Crystal Waters songs
House music songs
Mercury Records singles
Music videos directed by Marcus Nispel